Baroness is a noble title and the female equivalent of Baron.

Baroness or The Baroness may also refer to:
 The Baroness, the pen name of Elsa von Freytag-Loringhoven
 Raymonde "the Baroness" de Laroche (1882–1919), stunt pilot
 Baroness (band), a metal band from Savannah, Georgia
 Baroness (G.I. Joe), a fictional villain in the G.I. Joe universe
 Baroness (solitaire), a card game for one player
 The Baroness (album), a 2008 music recording by Sarah Slean
 The Baroness (novels), a 1970s series of spy novels by Paul Kenyon

See also 
 Baron (disambiguation)